Rabbit Peak is a mountain in the southern part of the Santa Rosa Mountains in the Peninsular Ranges in California. It is located in Riverside County in the Santa Rosa and San Jacinto Mountains National Monument near the border of San Diego County and the Anza-Borrego Desert State Park. It is located 14 miles northeast of Borrego Springs and 20 miles south of Indio.

The peak has been described as the hardest mountain to climb in Southern California due to elevation gain of the trails and the lack of water along those trails.

References 

Mountains of Riverside County, California
Mountains of Southern California
Santa Rosa Mountains (California)